The Claremont Canyon Conservancy provides stewardship and educational programs to its members and the public regarding the , mostly wildland,  Claremont Canyon at the Oakland/Berkeley border in Northern California. The conservancy grew out of a citizen-based task force formed after the  1991 Oakland Berkeley Firestorm. Over 500 member-households support the conservancy, . The conservancy works closely and cooperatively with multiple public landowners in Claremont Canyon including the East Bay Regional Park District, the  University of California, and the  City of Oakland, receiving grants and partnering in stewardship of the canyon.

The organization, a California nonprofit 501(c)(3), provides hands-on, volunteer programs, including reforestation of  coastal redwoods native to the East Bay Hills in areas of the canyon where  eucalyptus (E. globulus) stands were removed for wildfire hazard mitigation. "Redwood trees are a powerful, emotional symbol of coastal California," said Joe Engbeck, vice president of the Claremont Canyon Conservancy in 2008 and the man who organized the effort. "We can't bring the redwoods back everywhere in this urban area, but we can transform (part of) this canyon."  They also sponsor free nature walks from time to time on a variety of subjects.

References

External links
 Claremont Canyon Conservancy

Environmental organizations based in California
Charities based in California